Ricky Nana Agyemang, also known as Bullet is a Ghanaian Musician, Songwriter, Artiste Manager and a record Label owner. He was a member of the music group Ruff n Smooth with Ahkan.

Life and career

Earlier career 
Bullet started  his musical career as Etuo Aboba (meaning "Bullet" in Twi). He released an album under this name titled Wo Beko Wo Maame Ho. In 2008, he formed the group Ruff n Smooth with Ahkan. The duo released several songs including "Swagger", "Sex Machine",  "Azingele",  "Dance for Me", and "Naija Baby".

Record label 
Bullet is the founder and CEO of RuffTown Records. His first signed artist was the late Ebony Reigns. He later signed Danny Beat, Brella, Ms Forson, Wendy Shay, Fantana, and Ray James to the label.

Awards and nominations

References 

Ghanaian musicians
People from Accra
Living people
Year of birth missing (living people)